Midnight Without You is the second studio album by trumpet player Chris Botti. It was released by Verve Forecast Records on May 20, 1997. Botti co-wrote the album title track with The Blue Nile.

Track listing

Personnel 

 Chris Botti – trumpet (1-10), keyboards (1, 2, 3, 5, 6, 7, 9), acoustic piano (5, 9), atmosphere electronics (10)
 Harvey Jones – keyboards (1, 2, 5, 7),  atmosphere electronics (4)
 Paul Joseph Moore – keyboards (1, 2, 3, 5-10), acoustic piano (2, 6)
 John Levanthal – organ (3)
 Shane Fontayne – guitar (1-5, 10)
 Gerry Leonard – guitar (2, 5, 7, 10)
 Marc Shulman – guitar (2-9)
 Vincent Nguini – guitar (5)
 Larry Saltzman – guitar (9)
 Jeff Allen – bass (1-4, 6)
  Tony Levin – bass (5, 8)
 Bakithi Kumalo – bass (7, 9, 10)
 Shawn Pelton – snare drum (1), drum programming (1), drums (2, 3, 5-9)
 Jerry Marotta – brushed cymbals (1), Native American drums (4, 6, 10)
 Andy Snitzer – drum programming (2, 4, 5, 7, 10), acoustic piano (4, 7, 8)
 Joe Bonadio – tambourine (9), Native American drums (10), tom tom (10)
 Paul Buchanan – vocal (2)
 Jonatha Brooke – vocal (9)

Production 
 Chris Botti – producer, additional engineer 
 Paul Joseph Moore – producer, additional engineer 
 Kevin Killen – co-producer, engineer, mixing 
 Andy Snitzer – co-producer
 Guy Eckstine – executive producer
 Aron Keene – second engineer
 Kristen Koerner – second engineer
 Keith Shortreed – second engineer
 Bob Ludwig – mastering 
 Mike Charlasch – production coordination
 Giulio Turturro – art direction
 Sung Lee – design 
 Frank Ockenfels – photography 
 Marc Silag – management 
Studios
 Recorded at BearTracks Studios (Suffren, NY); Shelter Island Sound and Truck Sound Studios (New York City, NY).
 Mixed at Clinton Recording Studio (New York City, NY).
 Mastered at Gateway Mastering (Portland, ME).

Charts

References

Chris Botti albums
1997 albums
Verve Forecast Records albums
Instrumental albums